Family Plot is a 1976 American black comedy thriller film directed by Alfred Hitchcock in his final directing role. It was based on Victor Canning's 1972 novel The Rainbird Pattern, which Ernest Lehman adapted for the screen. The film stars Karen Black, Bruce Dern, Barbara Harris and William Devane; it was screened at the 1976 Cannes Film Festival, but was not entered into the main competition.

The story involves two couples: one a "fake" psychic and her cab-driving boyfriend, the other a pair of professional thieves and kidnappers. Their lives come into conflict because of a search for a missing heir. The film's title is a pun: "family plot" can refer to an area in a cemetery that has been bought by one family for the burial of its various relatives; in this case it also means a dramatic plot line involving various family members.

Plot
Fake psychic Blanche Tyler (Barbara Harris) and her boyfriend George Lumley (Bruce Dern) attempt to locate the nephew of wealthy, guilt-ridden, elderly Julia Rainbird (Cathleen Nesbitt). Julia's recently-deceased sister gave the baby boy up for adoption, but Julia now wants to make him her heir and will pay Blanche $10,000 to find him. Julia knows almost nothing about the infant. During his investigation George discovers that the boy was given the name Edward Shoebridge, and is thought to have died while still young. However George tracks down a man, Joseph Maloney (Ed Lauter), who paid for Edward's tombstone years after his supposed death, and George comes to think the grave is empty. George and Blanche bicker frequently, but he is as good an investigator as she is a psychic, and their relationship is solid.

Meanwhile, it has been revealed to the viewers that Shoebridge murdered his adoptive parents and faked his own death, and is now a successful jeweler in San Francisco known as Arthur Adamson (William Devane). He and his live-in girlfriend Fran (Karen Black) kidnap millionaires and dignitaries, confining them in a secure room in the cellar of their home, and return them in exchange for ransoms in the form of valuable gemstones. Arthur conceals the latest ransom, a large diamond, "in plain sight" within a crystal chandelier hanging above the home's main staircase.

When Adamson learns that George is investigating him, he enlists Maloney (the two had murdered Adamson's adoptive parents long ago) to kill Blanche and George. Maloney initially refuses to help, then contacts Blanche and George, telling them to meet him at a café on a mountain road. He cuts the brakeline of Blanche's car, but they manage to survive their dangerous high-speed descent. Maloney tries to run them over, but dies in a fiery explosion when he swerves to avoid an oncoming car and his car goes over the edge.

At Maloney's funeral, his wife (Katherine Helmond) tearfully confesses, under pressure of George's questioning, that Shoebridge's name is now Arthur Adamson. George must go to work driving his taxi for an evening shift, so Blanche tracks down various A. Adamsons in San Francisco, eventually reaching the jewelry store as it closes for the day. Arthur's assistant Mrs. Clay (Edith Atwater) offers to let Blanche leave a note. Blanche tricks Mrs. Clay into giving her his home address.

Arthur and Fran are bundling their latest kidnap victim, Bishop Wood (William Prince), into their car when Blanche rings their doorbell. They attempt to drive out of their garage, but Blanche's car blocks their way. She tells Arthur that his aunt wants to make him her heir, and for a moment everyone seems delighted with developments. Then Blanche sees the unconscious bishop, and she is abducted by the couple. Arthur drugs her and leaves her in the cellar, to deal with after they exchange the bishop for ransom.

Searching for Blanche, George finds her car outside Arthur and Fran's house. When no one answers the door, he breaks in and searches for her. He finds her handbag with blood stains on it, and indications of a struggle. When Arthur and Fran return home George hides upstairs. He overhears Arthur telling Fran about his plan to kill Blanche and make her death seem a suicide. George manages to talk to Blanche, who is faking unconsciousness in the cellar (left open by Arthur when he went to check on her) and they come up with a plan. Arthur and Fran enter to carry Blanche out to the car, but she knocks them down and runs out and George locks the kidnappers in.

Blanche then goes into what appears to be a genuine "trance". She walks out of the basement and climbs halfway up the main staircase, stops, and points at the huge diamond hidden in the chandelier. Blanche then "wakes" and asks George what she is doing there. He excitedly tells her that she is indeed a real psychic. He calls the police to collect the reward for capturing the kidnappers and finding the jewels. A smiling Blanche winks at the camera.

Cast
 Karen Black as Fran
 Bruce Dern as George Lumley
 Barbara Harris as Blanche Tyler
 William Devane as Arthur Adamson/Edward Shoebridge
 Cathleen Nesbitt as Julia Rainbird
 Ed Lauter as Joseph P. Maloney
 Katherine Helmond as Mrs. Maloney
 Nicholas Colasanto as Victor Constantine
 Edith Atwater as Mrs. Clay
 William Prince as Bishop Wood
 Marge Redmond as Vera Hannagan

Production
The film was adapted for the screen by Ernest Lehman, based on Victor Canning's 1972 novel The Rainbird Pattern. Lehman wanted the film to be sweeping, dark and dramatic, but Hitchcock kept pushing him toward lightness and comedy. Lehman's screenplay earned him a 1977 Edgar Award from the Mystery Writers of America.

The novel on which the film is based had earlier been rejected by Lehman, to whom it had been submitted as a potential project for him to either produce or direct, or both. Hitchcock's other collaboration with the screenwriter, North by Northwest (1959), was followed by several aborted projects. Lehman had incurred the director's anger by declining an offer to write the screenplay for No Bail for the Judge, a thriller set in London intended to star Audrey Hepburn, Laurence Harvey and actor John Williams. Although Hitchcock eventually had a fine screenplay, and pre-production (location scouting and costumes) was at an advanced stage, the film was never made; Hepburn became pregnant and Hitchcock turned to another project, Psycho (1960), instead.

By September 1973, Ernest Lehman had been persuaded to do the adaptation again — Hitchcock explained that he intended to keep only the bare-bones of Canning's novel and to relocate the story from England to California. One of the early decisions was to drop Canning's title and the project was branded Deceit. Partway through filming, Variety confirmed in mid-July 1975 that the film had been retitled Family Plot.

Hitchcock, who often liked to specify the locales of his films by using on-screen titles or by using recognizable landmarks, deliberately left the story's location unspecific, using sites in both San Francisco and Los Angeles. The chase scene in the movie, which writer Donald Spoto called a spoof on car chases prevalent in films at the time, was filmed on the extensive Universal backlot. The restaurant used in the film was also built on the backlot and was shown on studio tours in 1975.

Hitchcock's signature cameo in Family Plot can be seen 40 minutes into the film. He appears in silhouette through the glass door of the Registrar of Births and Deaths.

Following Family Plot, Hitchcock worked on the script for a projected spy thriller, The Short Night. His declining health prevented the filming of the screenplay, which was published in a book during Hitchcock's last years. Universal chose not to film the script with another director, although it did authorize sequels to Hitchcock's Psycho.

Casting

Hitchcock considered such actors as Burt Reynolds and Roy Scheider (for Adamson), Al Pacino (for George), Faye Dunaway (for Fran), and Beverly Sills and Goldie Hawn (for Blanche) for the film. Cybill Shepherd wrote in her memoir that she had hoped to play the part of Fran, which eventually went to Karen Black. High salary demands were partly responsible for his turning to other actors. Although Liza Minnelli was among the stars recommended to Hitchcock, he was especially delighted to work with Barbara Harris as the medium. He had previously tried to hire her for other film projects.

Hitchcock had earlier worked with Bruce Dern on episodes of Alfred Hitchcock Presents and on Marnie (1964), in which he had a brief role in a flashback playing a doomed sailor.

Music
For the score, Universal's music executive, Harry Garfield, recommended John Williams to Hitchcock, following the Oscar and critical acclaim of his music score for Jaws.

The film was the only Hitchcock production to be scored by Williams, who has stated that Hitchcock wanted choir voices for Madame Blanche to make her seem psychic towards the beginning, and that Hitchcock was at the scoring sessions most of the time and would often give him suggestions. For the scene in which Maloney suddenly disappears from Adamson's office, Hitchcock suggested that Williams stop the music when the camera cuts to the open window to indicate to the audience that Maloney has left through it. Hitchcock then went on to say, "Mr. Williams, murder can be fun", when he suggested that he should conduct the music lightly for a darker scene of the film. Williams stated that it was a great privilege, and that he had a wonderful working experience with the director.

The complete soundtrack was not released upon the film's release date. Few themes from the film were released on John Williams and Alfred Hitchcock compilation albums. For years afterwards, the original soundtrack was not available, spawning many bootleg copies of the complete scoring sessions of the film over the internet. Finally in 2010, Varèse Sarabande officially released a limited edition of the complete Original Motion Picture Soundtrack, 34 years after the film's initial release.

Reception
Family Plot has received praise from critics. Vincent Canby of The New York Times called the film "a witty, relaxed lark", adding that it was "certainly Hitchcock's most cheerful film in a long time, but it's hardly innocent." Roger Ebert gave the film three out of four stars, saying of it: "And it's a delight for two contradictory reasons: because it's pure Hitchcock, with its meticulous construction and attention to detail, and because it's something new for Hitchcock—a macabre comedy, essentially. He doesn't go for shock here, or for violent effects, but for the gradual tightening of a narrative noose." Variety called the film "a dazzling achievement for Alfred Hitchcock. Masterfully controlling finely-tuned shifts from comedy to drama throughout a highly complex mystery-suspense plot, Hitchcock has created a film that has the involving detail work and teasing fascination of a novel to be read in front of a crackling fire on a rainy evening." Charles Champlin of the Los Angeles Times praised the film as "atmospheric, characterful, precisely paced, intricately plotted, exciting and suspenseful, beautifully acted and, perhaps more than anything else, amusing." Penelope Gilliatt of The New Yorker called the film "one of the saltiest and most endearing" films Hitchcock ever directed, adding, "Sometimes in his career, Hitchcock has seemed to manipulate the audience; in this, his fifty-third film, he is our accomplice, turning his sense of play to our benefit." Richard Combs of The Monthly Film Bulletin praised "the compact allusiveness and crisp elegance of Ernest Lehman's writing, which so deftly builds its own tongue-in-cheek attitudes into the material," and found that Bruce Dern and Barbara Harris made "a delightfully nuanced comic duet." Dave Kehr of the Chicago Reader called the film "[A] small masterpiece, one of Hitchcock's most adventurous and expressive experiments in narrative form."

However, some reviews were more critical. Gene Siskel of the Chicago Tribune gave the film two-and-a-half stars and called it a "disappointment", finding that it "descends into dull jokes, plastic characters, and a television sitcom conclusion." Gary Arnold of The Washington Post called the film "a chore to sit through", adding, "Lehman and Hitchcock are trying to recapture the old magic, but they've lost their touch."

The film holds a 92% approval rating on Rotten Tomatoes, based on 36 reviews, and an average rating of 7 out of 10. The site's critical consensus reads: "The Master of Suspense's swan song finds him aiming for pulpy thrills and hitting the target, delivering a twisty crime story with pleasurable bite." On Metacritic, the film has a weighted average score of 79 out of 100 based on 8 critics, indicating "generally favourable reviews". The film earned $6.5 million in rentals.

Released in the year of the United States Bicentennial, Family Plot was chosen to open the 1976 Filmex (Los Angeles International Film Exposition) to honor American cinematography.

Barbara Harris was nominated for Best Actress – Motion Picture Comedy or Musical at the 34th Golden Globe Awards.

References

External links
 
 
 
 
 
 

1976 films
1976 comedy films
1970s mystery films
1970s psychological thriller films
American comedy thriller films
1970s English-language films
Films directed by Alfred Hitchcock
Films produced by Alfred Hitchcock
American detective films
Edgar Award-winning works
Films based on thriller novels
American mystery films
Universal Pictures films
Films shot in San Francisco
Films scored by John Williams
Films based on British novels
Films about kidnapping
Films with screenplays by Ernest Lehman
1970s American films